The 2011 5-hour Energy 200 was the 11th stock car race of the 2011 NASCAR Nationwide Series and the 30th iteration of the event. The race was held on Saturday May 14, 2011 in Dover, Delaware at Dover International Speedway, a 1-mile (1.6 km) permanent oval-shaped racetrack. Carl Edwards won the race after a spectacular crash on the final lap of the race after two Green-White-Checkered attempts.

Background
Dover International Speedway is an oval race track in Dover, Delaware, United States that has held at least two NASCAR races since it opened in 1969. In addition to NASCAR, the track also hosted USAC and the NTT IndyCar Series. The track features one layout, a 1-mile (1.6 km) concrete oval, with 24° banking in the turns and 9° banking on the straights. The speedway is owned and operated by Dover Motorsports.

The track, nicknamed "The Monster Mile", was built in 1969 by Melvin Joseph of Melvin L. Joseph Construction Company, Inc., with an asphalt surface, but was replaced with concrete in 1995. Six years later in 2001, the track's capacity moved to 135,000 seats, making the track have the largest capacity of sports venue in the mid-Atlantic. In 2002, the name changed to Dover International Speedway from Dover Downs International Speedway after Dover Downs Gaming and Entertainment split, making Dover Motorsports. From 2007 to 2009, the speedway worked on an improvement project called "The Monster Makeover", which expanded facilities at the track and beautified the track. After the 2014 season, the track's capacity was reduced to 95,500 seats.

Entry List
(R) denotes rookie driver
(i) denotes driver who is ineligible for series driver points

Qualifying
Carl Edwards won the pole after qualifying was rained out.

* - David Reutimann had to start at the rear of the field due to missing the drivers meeting

Race
During the first lap, Ricky Stenhouse Jr. took the lead from pole sitter Carl Edwards. In turn 3,  MacDonald Motorsports teammates Donnie Neuenberger and Blake Koch crashed in turn 3 after Neuenberger got spun by Mike Bliss bringing out the first caution of the race. Stenhouse led the first lap. The race got back underway on lap 8 of the race with Stenhouse leading. On lap 20, the second caution came out when Kevin Lepage blew a right front tire and hit the wall in turn 3. On the restart on lap 25, Clint Bowyer took the lead from Stenhouse. Stenhouse took the lead back on lap 30. Bowyer took the lead back on lap 39. 2 laps later, the third caution flew for it being the competition caution. Carl Edwards won the race off of pit road and was the new race leader. Bowyer took the lead from Edwards on the restart. On the next lap, the fourth caution flew when Brian Scott spun out of turn 4 and hit the inside wall. The race restarted on lap 51 with Bowyer leading the race. On lap 75, Edwards took the lead from Bowyer.

On lap 87, one of the strangest crashes in NASCAR history occurred. Alex Kennedy got loose coming out of turn 2 and his car spun and hit the inside wall on the backstretch. His car stopped with the tail of car on the inside wall and the nose of the car pointing towards the outside wall. Kennedy sat there waiting for traffic to clear by so he can get to pit road. Kennedy got his car to start rolling across the track and began to turn the wheel to the left. The car could not turn and Kennedy pulled up right in front of Kevin Swindell and the two crashed into each other head on with Aric Almirola dodging both cars in the crash. The impact broke the front axle of Kennedy's car as it was hanging out of the front of the car. Both drivers walked away but this made Swindell mad since this was a one-off deal with Roush Racing and he was running well after he was filling in for Trevor Bayne due to Bayne feeling ill and his day ended during a caution flag when someone drove across the racetrack right in front of him. The race restarted on lap 101 with Carl Edwards taking the lead from Brad Keselowski. On lap 140, the 6th caution flew when Justin Allgaier blew a right-front tire and hit the wall in turn 3. On lap 145, the red flag was issued due to rain in the area. After a 24-minute red flag, the cars got back on the race track. The race restarted on lap 149 with Carl Edwards leading the field. On the next lap, Logano took the lead from Edwards.

Final Laps
With 14 laps to go, Edwards took the lead from Logano and built a manageable lead. It looked like Edwards was gonna win the race by a good margin. But with 4 laps to go, Michael Annett crashed on the frontstretch bringing out the 7th caution of the race and setting up a green-white-checkered finish. On the restart, Edwards took the lead from Logano. But as soon as they got the green flag, Eric McClure's car stalled bringing out the 8th caution and setting up a second attempt of a green-white-checkered finish. On the restart, Edwards and Logano began to fight for the lead as they began to race side by side. Logano got a slight advantage down the backstretch trying to take the lead. Edwards got a bit loose in turn 4 and his car came up towards Joey. Logano got loose out of turn 4 and hit the outside wall. Logano came down the racetrack right in front of Clint Bowyer. Bowyer's car ramped over Logano's car, flew in the air and landed on the driver's side of the car then came back on all 4 wheels. While Logano and Bowyer were crashing, other cars behind them checked up and ran into each other causing an 8 car accident on the front stretch. Bowyer's car also took another shot by Steve Wallace after Wallace spun trying to check up and avoid the crash. The white flag had already flown before the 9th and final caution came out for the massive accident on the front stretch. The cars involved were Joey Logano, Clint Bowyer, Steve Wallace, Elliott Sadler, Mike Bliss, Kyle Busch, Brad Keselowski, and Aric Almirola. The race finished under caution and Carl Edwards won the race. After Edwards took the checkered flag, he went over to Logano after Logano climbed out of his car to see if he was ok and also talk about what happened when Joey spun out of turn 4 that triggered the massive crash. The two calmly talked for about 11 seconds and Edwards drove his car to victory lane. Replays showed that Logano's car spun in 4 but Edwards appeared to never make any contact with Logano's car. Despite a pretty damaged front end of his racecar after being caught up in the wreck, Kyle Busch finished runner up. Reed Sorenson, Ricky Stenhouse Jr., and David Reutimann rounded out the top 5 while Elliott Sadler, Kenny Wallace, James Buescher, Aric Almirola, and Mike Wallace rounded out the top 10.

Race results

References

2011 in sports in Delaware
NASCAR races at Dover Motor Speedway
May 2011 sports events in the United States